Bruno Fevery is a Belgian guitarist.

Fevery has played guitar in several bands, most notably in the rock band Vista Chino, formerly known as Kyuss Lives!. While a member of the multi-genred Belgian band Arsenal, Fevery met ex-Kyuss vocalist John Garcia when Garcia recorded guest vocals on two songs for the Arsenal album Lotuk. Fevery told Garcia that he played in a Kyuss tribute band as a teenager. This familiarity with Kyuss' music made him an obvious choice to replace Josh Homme, when Garcia toured with his project Garcia Plays Kyuss and again when Garcia decided to attempt a resurrection of Kyuss with the band Kyuss Lives!.

Discography
Helmut Lotti – Out of Africa (1999)
Helmut Lotti – "Shosholoza" Single (1999)
Arsenal – Outsides (2005)
Stash – Blue Lanes (2007)
Baloji – Hotel Impala (2007)
Arsenal – Outsides EP (2007)
Arsenal – De Poolreizigers (2007)
Les Talons Gitans – L′amour sans pédales (2007)
Arsenal – Lotuk (2008)
Monza – Attica! (2008)
Meuris – Spectrum (2010)
Les Talons Gitans – Vieil Indien (2010)
Arno – Brussld (2010)
Arsenal – Lokemo (2011)
Vista Chino – Peace (2013)
Nick Oliveri's Uncontrollable – Leave Me Alone (2014)

References

Living people
Belgian rock guitarists
Kyuss members
Year of birth missing (living people)